Adé Sapara (born 1964) is an English actor, mainly in supporting roles in films and TV series.

Filmography
Sammy and Rosie Get Laid, 1987
Crusoe, 1989
Riff-Raff, 1991
The Bill, 1993, one TV episode & 2000, two TV episodes
Privateer 2: The Darkening, 1996
Nachtgestalten (or Nightshapes), 1999)
Doctors, 2002, one TV episode
Casualty, 1991, 1995 and 2005, three TV episodes
Holby City, 2005, two TV episodes
London Fields, 2015
2036: Nexus Dawn, 2017
London's Burning, 1993 & 1994, 4 TV episodes

References

External links

English male television actors
Living people
1964 births
English male film actors